Aura Rosario Rosal López is the wife of Former Guatemalan President Óscar Humberto Mejía Víctores. She married Óscar Mejía Víctores in 1953 and had two daughters: Aura and Juana Rosario.

After the overthrow of Efraín Ríos Montt, Mejía Víctores assumed the position of Head of State. She maintained a low profile as First Lady. Mejía Víctores died on February 1, 2016.

References

Living people
Date of birth missing (living people)
First ladies of Guatemala
1928 births